Haematosticta is a monotypic moth genus of the family Noctuidae. Its only species, Haematosticta sanguiguttata, is found in Sri Lanka. Both the genus and species were first described by George Hampson in 1896.

References

Acontiinae
Monotypic moth genera